The Moon of Pejeng, also known as the Pejeng Moon, in Bali is the largest single-cast bronze kettle drum in the world. and "the largest known relic from Southeast Asia's Bronze Age period." It is "considered highly sacred by local people." It is thought to be a relic of early rice cultivation rituals.

It is kept at Pura Penataran Sasih Temple in Pejeng, near Ubud, in the Petauan River valley which, along with the adjacent Pakerisan River valley, forms the heartland of South Bali where complex irrigated rice culture first evolved on the island.

History 
The Dong Son people made the drum around 300 B.C., more than two thousand years ago.  According to Balinese legend, the Pejeng Moon was a wheel of the chariot that pulled the real moon through the night sky. One night, as the chariot was passing over Pejeng, the wheel detached and fell to earth, landing in a tree, where it glowed nearly as brightly as the real moon. This light disturbed a thief who, annoyed, climbed the tree and urinated on it; the thief paid for his sacrilege with his life. The moon eventually cooled and has been preserved as a sacred relic by the local villagers.

It is the largest and most complete type of drum known as the Pejeng type drums which have been found in Bali and Java, Indonesia.

The Pejeng Moon was first reported to the western world by G.E. Rumphius in his book The Ambonese Curiosity Cabinet, published in 1705. The Moon was first systematically described by the Dutch artist W.O.J. Nieuwenkamp who reproduced the famous face motif.

See also 
 Bronze drum

References 

Drums
Bronze Age
Gianyar Regency
Indonesian musical instruments
Dong Son bronze drums